A jugate consists of two portraits side by side to suggest, to the viewer, the closeness of each to the other. The word comes from the Latin, jugatus, meaning joined. On coins, it is commonly used for married couples, brothers, or a father and son.

Often this would be a presidential and vice presidential candidates although sometimes a state or local candidate is included with a presidential candidate. Jugates may be seen on medals, pinbacks, buttons, posters or other campaign items. If a third figure appears on the item, it is called a trigate.

Gallery

References
Hake, Ted: Guide to Presidential Campaign Collectibles, Krause Publications, 1991, p. 175

Posters
Memorabilia
Badges